Pasunoori Dayakar( 2 August 1967) is an Indian Politician. He was elected to the Lok Sabha the lower house of Indian Parliament from Warangal constituency in Telangana in a bye election in 2015 as a member of the Telangana Rashtra Samithi.

References

External links
 Official biographical sketch in Parliament of India website

Telangana Rashtra Samithi politicians
Living people
People from Telangana
Telangana politicians
People from Warangal
Lok Sabha members from Telangana
India MPs 2014–2019
1967 births
India MPs 2019–present